Xie Keyin (born Xie Xue []; January 4, 1997) is a Chinese actress, rapper and songwriter. She is best known for finishing 5th in the survival show Youth with You 2, making her a member of THE9. THE9 officially disbanded on December 5, 2021 and Xie Keyin became a solo artist.

Early life
Xie Keyin was born as Xie Xue on January 4, 1997 in Sichuan, China. She graduated from Nanjing University of the Arts. In April 2017, she changed her name from Xie Xue to her current name.

Career

2016–2019: Career beginnings and debut in 2019
In 2016, Xie participated in Super Girl. She also participated in Girls Fighting.

In October 2018, she participated in Dragon TV's reality survival girl group show The Next Top Bang, where she was first introduced to hip-hop and rap. Xie, together with five other surviving members, debuted as LEGAL HIGH in January 2019 with the single "嗨". The group released their second single, "心星", in February. They also won the "Best New Artist" award at the 26th Chinese Top Ten Music Awards in March.

On October 23, 2019, Xie made her solo debut with her self-produced single "NEVER SAY DIE" for the Youth Basketball Union.

2020–2021: Youth With You 2, THE9 and rise in popularity

In 2020, Xie took part in iQiyi's reality-survival program Youth With You 2. She eventually finished 5th with a total of 6,826,411 votes in the finals. She then debuted as a member of THE9.

After debuting with THE9, Xie actively participates in songwriting. THE9 released their first EP, Sphinx X Mystery, with two tracks, "SphinX" and "Not Me". Xie took part in the writing of lyrics for both tracks. She collaborated with Silence Wang for the single "Tell Me A Joke", released on August 27, 2020, which she co-wrote. Xie also contributed rap lyrics and sang in the promotional OST "Wings" for the movie Let Life be Beautiful. This song was nominated for the 2020 SINA Top 10 Best Movies and TV Series. In December 2020, THE9 released their first album. Xie took part in writing her own solo single "COMET" as well as fellow THE9 member Yu Shuxin's solo single "GWALLA." On March 26 and 27 of 2021, Xie participated in THE9's first virtual concert, debuting her solo stage for "COMET" and performing other THE9 group songs. Later that year, TME Tencent Music invited Xie to be part of its "Today is Valentine's Day" project, for which she wrote a new single, "Black Cupid". The single was released on June 14, 2021.

Besides music production works, Xie Keyin also develops her potentials in other areas of performing arts. In November 2020, she became a regular host in the cultural variety show Glory is Back. Under the leadership of exploration team leader Wang Han, Xie and two other exploration team interns, Qian Zhenghao and Li Haoran, presented the different dimensions of Dunhuang culture to a wider audience, including the younger generation. In December 2020, Xie participated in the variety show I Am the Actor Season 3 as a "new era idol". Her acting skills stunned judges and the general public, and after five rounds of competition, she reached the finals and received the "Best Potential Award." In March 2021, Xie was cast as one of the leading actors in the TV Series "Left Right" alongside Qin Hao, Ren Suxi, and Nie Yuan. On May 13, a female-focused sitcom format variety show, "Lady's Club," was officially announced with Zhang Tianai, Yang Zishan, and Xie Keyin as the main cast. Xie took on the new role as Club Founder/Chen Xingtong. In September 2021, Xie Keyin joins the main cast of the movie "Become a Winner" as Wu Yanyan alongside leads Li Chen and Celina Jade. The movie is produced by Xu Zheng and directed by Ren Pengyuan.。

THE9 officially disbanded on December 5, 2021. Xie Keyin became a solo artist.

2021-: Post THE9, solo works 
On December 12,2021, Xie Keyin was invited to participate in CCTV6 Film Channel’s Silk Road International Film Festival and she wrote rap lyrics for song performance “七溜八溜 不离福州.” On December 27, 2021, Xie Keyin was nominated by Lu Chuan to become a finalist of the "CCTV6 Starry Oceans Young Actors Film Project." Through the project she participated in the 34th Golden Rooster Awards. 。

Discography

Singles

Songwriting credits

Filmography

Television series

Films

Variety shows

Notes

References

External links
 
 

1997 births
Living people
THE9 members
People from Sichuan
Chinese women rappers
Youth With You contestants
Chinese pop singers
21st-century Chinese women singers